M. D. Nandana Gunathilake (born 7 September 1962) is a Sri Lankan politician and a former member of the Parliament of Sri Lanka. He also contested for the presidential election under his previous party, the  JVP.

References

Living people
Sri Lankan Buddhists
Members of the 11th Parliament of Sri Lanka
Members of the 12th Parliament of Sri Lanka
Members of the 13th Parliament of Sri Lanka
Janatha Vimukthi Peramuna politicians
Jathika Nidahas Peramuna politicians
Sri Lanka Freedom Party politicians
United People's Freedom Alliance politicians
United National Party politicians
1962 births
People from Panadura
Candidates in the 1999 Sri Lankan presidential election